Gazellospira is an extinct genus of antelope from the Miocene to Pleistocene of Europe and Asia.

Pleistocene even-toed ungulates